David Jablin is a producer and director of film and television comedies. In 1981 he created and produced the comedy anthology series Likely Stories for HBO/Cinemax.

Jablin produced and directed the film The Don's Analyst,  and directed, produced and executive-produced other National Lampoon films.

References

External links
David Jablin's official website

American television producers
Living people
Writers Guild of America Award winners
Year of birth missing (living people)